Bhaba Pass, also known as Bhawa Pass, is a high mountain pass (elevation ) situated in the northern Indian state of Himachal Pradesh in the Indian Himalayas. It is located on the border of Kinnaur district and Lahaul and Spiti District, and borders Pin Valley National Park and the Rupi-Bhaba Wildlife Sanctuary.

Bhaba Pass connects the green and fertile Bhaba valley on the Kinnaur side with the barren high-elevation Pin valley on the Spiti side.

Overview
National Highway 22 runs alongside River Sutlej until Wangtu gives way to a narrow road leading to Katgaon and Kafnu. Katgaon and Kafnu are the base for one of the most beautiful trek routes in Himachal, the Bhaba trek. A moderate climb towards a glacial fed stream Bhaba river, to Bhabha Pass at  elevation to enter Pin Valley in Spiti is a challenging adventure. The first village in Spiti is Mud.  Another trek in the west from the Bhaba Pass gets into Parvati Valley of Kullu.

Distance
 Delhi: 
 Shimla: 
 Chandigarh:

Gallery

References

Geography of Himachal Pradesh
Mountain passes of Himachal Pradesh
Geography of Lahaul and Spiti district
Geography of Kinnaur district